P. Unni (born 11 July 1947) is an Indian politician of the Communist Party of India (Marxist). He was a member of 14th Kerala Legislative Assembly and represented Ottapalam constituency.

He also served as Palakkad District Secretary of Communist Party of India (Marxist) for over 15 years and currently state committee member of Communist Party of India (Marxist).

See also
 Kerala Legislative Assembly
 M. Hamsa
 K. D. Prasenan
 K. Krishnankutty
 A. K. Balan
 K. Babu
 P. K. Sasi
 K. V. Vijayadas
 Muhammed Muhsin

References

Living people
Kerala MLAs 2016–2021
People from Ottapalam
1947 births
Communist Party of India (Marxist) politicians from Kerala